Mentha diemenica, commonly known as  slender mint, is a flowering plant in the Lamiaceae family. It grows in the Northern Territory, Australian Capital Territory and all mainland states except Western Australia. It has mint-scented foliage and clusters of purple flowers.

Description
The branches are covered with occasional to thickly recurved hairs. The purple or rarely white  flowers are usually borne in clusters of 3-8  at the end of branches in the leaf axil, lobes pointed or widely pointed, outer surface thickly covered with short hairs and long hairs on the margin.

Taxonomy and naming
Mentha diemenica was first formally described in 1825 by Carl Sprengel and the description was published in Systema Vegetabilium.The specific epithet (diemenica) is in reference to Van Diemen's Land the former name of Tasmania.

Distribution and habitat
Slender mint grows in damp locations, clay to sandy soils in montane woodland and grassland. It is found in all states of Australia with the exception of Western Australia.

See also
List of Australian herbs and spices

References

diemenica
Endemic flora of Australia
Plants described in 1825